Sports in Canada consist of a wide variety of games.  The roots of organized sports in Canada date back to the 1770s, culminating in the development and popularization of the major professional games of ice hockey, lacrosse, basketball, baseball, soccer, football and cricket. Canada's official national sports are ice hockey (winter official) and lacrosse (summer official). Golf, baseball, tennis, skiing, ringette, badminton, cricket, volleyball, cycling, swimming, bowling, rugby union, canoeing, equestrian, squash, and the study of martial arts are widely enjoyed at the youth and amateur levels. Great achievements in Canadian sports are recognized by Canada's Sports Hall of Fame, while the Lou Marsh Trophy is awarded annually to Canada's top athlete by a panel of journalists. There are numerous other Sports Halls of Fame in Canada.

Canada shares several major professional sports leagues with the United States. Canadian teams in these leagues include seven franchises in the National Hockey League, as well as three Major League Soccer teams and one team in each of Major League Baseball and the National Basketball Association. Other popular professional sports in Canada include Canadian football, which is played in the Canadian Football League, National Lacrosse League lacrosse, and curling.

Canada has enjoyed greater success at the Winter Olympics than at the Summer Olympics and has hosted several high-profile international sporting events, including the 1976 Summer Olympics, the 1988 Winter Olympics, the 1994 Basketball World Championship, the 2007 FIFA U-20 World Cup, the 2010 Winter Olympics and the 2015 FIFA Women's World Cup. Most recently, Canada hosted the 2015 Pan American Games and 2015 Parapan American Games in Toronto, the former being one of the largest sporting event hosted by the country. The country is also scheduled to co-host the 2026 FIFA World Cup, alongside Mexico and the United States.

History

The history of Canadian sports falls into five stages of development: early recreational activities before 1840; the start of organized competition, 1840–1880; the emergence of national organizations, 1882–1914; the rapid growth of both amateur and professional sports, 1914 to 1960; and developments of the last century   Some sports, especially ice hockey, ringette, lacrosse, and curling, enjoy an international reputation as particularly Canadian.

Governance

Federal and provincial governments are both actively involved in sports each has areas of jurisdiction which overlap sports. Sport Canada generally directs (or at least co-ordinates) federal activity in sports. While the federal government generally tries to take a leadership role in areas of international competition (where its jurisdiction is clearest) some provinces, especially Quebec, are actively involved in sports at all levels, even with elite international athletes.  Provinces will often focus on student athletics, as it falls more clearly in an area of provincial jurisdiction (that being education).

University and collegiate sport
U Sports is the national governing body for university sports, while the Canadian Collegiate Athletic Association governs college sports. A factor which affects athletic participation levels in U Sports member institutions is the U Sports restriction that scholarships cover tuition only, drawing many of Canada's best student athletes to the United States where organizations such as the National Collegiate Athletic Association (NCAA) allow "full ride" scholarships which include tuition, books, housing, and travel. Another is the popular Canadian Hockey League (for male hockey players aged 15 to 20), which effectively serves as the primary development league for the professional National Hockey League, although CHL teams offer financial support for players who choose to play U Sports hockey after leaving the CHL.

National sports
Canada has two de jure national sports: ice hockey and lacrosse.

In May 1964, former Canadian Amateur Hockey Association president and then current member of parliament Jack Roxburgh did extensive research to find if Canadian parliament had ever declared a national game, and specifically looked into whether lacrosse was officially declared. After going through parliamentary records, he found no law was ever enacted. The Canadian Press reported at the time that the myth of lacrosse as Canada's national game possibly came from a book published in 1869 titled Lacrosse, the National Game of Canada, and that the Canadian Lacrosse Association was founded in 1867. His endeavour to declare hockey as Canada's national game coincided with the Great Canadian Flag Debate of 1964. On October 28, 1964, Roxburgh moved to introduce Bill C–132, with respect to declaring hockey as the national game of Canada.

Canadian Lacrosse Association members responded to the motion by calling it insulting and "out of line", and vowed to fight it. On June 11, 1965, Bob Prittie replied by introducing a separate bill to have lacrosse declared as Canada's national game and stated that, "I think it is fitting at this time when we are considering national flags, national anthems and other national symbols, that this particular matter should be settled now". The choice of Canada's national game was debated in 1965, but neither bill was passed when parliament was dissolved. In 1967, Prime Minister Lester B. Pearson proposed to name national summer and winter games, but nothing was resolved.

In 1994, First Nations groups objected to a government bill that proposed establishing ice hockey as Canada's national sport, arguing that it neglected recognition of the game of lacrosse, a uniquely Indigenous contribution. In response, the House of Commons amended a bill "to recognize hockey as Canada's Winter Sport and lacrosse as Canada's Summer Sport". On May 12, 1994, the National Sports of Canada Act came into force with these designations.

Although the legislation included seasonal designations, both sports can be played in different seasons. Lacrosse can be played all year, in all seasons, indoor and outdoors. During colder seasons ice hockey may be played indoor and outdoors, although in warmer seasons, its play requires the use of artificial ice, typically found at an indoor ice rink.

Ice hockey

The modern form of ice hockey began in Canada in the late 19th century, and is widely considered Canada's national pastime, with high levels of participation by children, men and women at various levels of competition. The Stanley Cup, considered the premiere trophy in professional ice hockey, originated in Canada in 1893. Prominent trophies for national championships in Canada are the Memorial Cup for the top junior-age men's team and the Allan Cup for the top men's senior team. There are national championships in several other divisions of play. Hockey Canada is the sport's official governing body in Canada and is a member of the International Ice Hockey Federation (IIHF). A Canadian national men's team, composed of professionals, competes in the annual IIHF Men's World Championship and in the Olympics.

The National Hockey League (NHL) is a professional hockey league that includes teams from both Canada and the United States. Presently, the NHL includes seven teams in Canada: the Calgary Flames, Edmonton Oilers, Montreal Canadiens, Ottawa Senators, Toronto Maple Leafs, Vancouver Canucks, and the Winnipeg Jets. The Canadian NHL presence peaked with eight teams in the mid-1990s, before the Quebec Nordiques relocated to Denver, Colorado in 1995 and a previous incarnation of the Winnipeg Jets relocated to Phoenix, Arizona in 1996. The NHL returned to Winnipeg in 2011 when the Atlanta Thrashers relocated and became the current Winnipeg Jets. The league, founded in Canada, retains a substantial Canadian content as roughly half of its players are Canadian. Hockey Night in Canada is a longtime national Saturday night television broadcast featuring Canadian NHL teams. Junior-age ice hockey is also a popular spectator sport. The junior-age Canadian Hockey League is broadcast nationally and its annual Memorial Cup championship is a popular television event. The annual IIHF World U20 Championship, played during December and January, is popular among Canadian television viewers and has been held in Canada numerous times due to its popularity.

Lacrosse

The First Nations began playing the sport more than 500 years ago. Today lacrosse not only remains an integral part of Indigenous culture, but is played by tens of thousands of people across Canada and the north eastern United States. From its origin as 'The Creator's Game' to the healthy popularity of the modern game, lacrosse has survived the test of time after treading down a long, controversial path that led it to become recognized as Canada's official national summer sport.

The Canadian Lacrosse Association, founded in 1925, is the governing body of lacrosse in Canada. It conducts national junior and senior championship tournaments for men and women in both field and box lacrosse. It also participated in the inaugural World Indoor Lacrosse Championship in 2003. As of 2018, the only active professional lacrosse league in Canada is the National Lacrosse League, which plays an indoors variation of the game known as box lacrosse. A total of five of the league's thirteen franchises are located in Canada: the Vancouver Warriors, Calgary Roughnecks, Saskatchewan Rush, Toronto Rock, and Halifax Thunderbirds. The 2006 World Lacrosse Championship was held in London, Ontario. Canada beat the United States 15–10 in the final to break a 28-year U.S. winning streak. One of the best lacrosse players of all time, Gary Gait was born in Victoria, British Columbia and has won every possible major lacrosse championship. Great achievements in Canadian Lacrosse are recognized by the Canadian Lacrosse Hall of Fame.

Team sports

Baseball

The world's first documented baseball game took place in Beachville, Ontario on June 4, 1838.  Although more strongly associated with the United States, baseball has existed in Canada from the very beginning. The world's oldest baseball park still in operation is Labatt Park in London, Ontario. It is home to the London Majors of the semi-pro Intercounty Baseball League.

Presently, the Toronto Blue Jays are Canada's only Major League Baseball team, founded in 1977. The Montreal Expos (the first MLB team in Canada) played in Montreal from 1969 until 2004 when they moved to Washington, D.C. and became the Washington Nationals. The Blue Jays were the first non-American team to host a World Series Game (in 1992) and the only non-American team to win the World Series (back to back in 1992 and 1993). The Blue Jays had the highest attendance in Major League Baseball during the late 1980s and early 1990s. Professional baseball has a long history in Canada, beginning with teams such as the London Tecumsehs, Montreal Royals, and Toronto Maple Leafs in the late 19th and early 20th centuries. All three were included on the National Baseball Association's top 100 minor league teams.

A number of Canadians have played in the major leagues, and several have won the highest honours in baseball. Ferguson Jenkins won the National League Cy Young Award in 1971 as the best pitcher in the league, and in 1991 became the first Canadian inducted in the (U.S.) Baseball Hall of Fame. Larry Walker, set for Hall of Fame induction in 2020, was National League MVP for the 1997 season and was the league's batting champion 3 times.  Since 2000, Éric Gagné won the National League Cy Young Award in 2003, Jason Bay was the first Canadian to be named rookie of the year in 2004, and Justin Morneau (American League, 2006), Joey Votto (National League, 2010) and Freddie Freeman (National League, 2020) have won MVP honours.

The Canada national baseball team has participated in all editions of the World Baseball Classic. In the 2006 World Baseball Classic, the team upset Team USA in first-round play, which some people in Canada call the "Miracle on Dirt" (a play on the phrase "Miracle on Ice" for the 1980 U.S. Olympic Hockey team). However, the team has yet to progress past the first round.

The only Canadian team in MLB-affiliated minor leagues is the Vancouver Canadians of the Northwest League (Short-Season A). There are a number of independent minor league teams, as well as semi-professional and collegiate baseball teams in Canada (see List of baseball teams in Canada). Great achievements in Canadian baseball are recognized by the Canadian Baseball Hall of Fame.

Basketball

Basketball has very strong roots in Canada. The inventor, James Naismith, was Canadian; born in Almonte, Ontario, he was working as a physical education instructor in Massachusetts when he created the game in 1891. As many as 10 of the players in that first game were Canadian students from Quebec. Basketball is a popular sport in parts of Canada, especially in Nova Scotia, Southern Alberta, and more recently Southern Ontario.

The popularity of basketball in Nova Scotia is at the high school and college level.  Nova Scotia is home to three perennially strong college basketball programs. Saint Mary's University, Acadia University, and St. Francis Xavier University have made 22, 21, and 13 appearances in the U Sports men's championship, respectively. Carleton University has dominated the U Sports championship in recent years, winning 14 titles in 17 years from 2003 to the present.

Four Canadian-born individuals and one naturalized Canadian have been inducted to the Naismith Memorial Basketball Hall of Fame—Naismith and longtime U.S. college coach and instructor Pete Newell as contributors; Ernie Quigley, who officiated over 1,500 U.S. college games, as a referee; and Bob Houbregs, a superstar at the University of Washington in the early 1950s who went on to a career in the NBA. Newell is also separately recognized by the Hall as the head coach of the 1960 USA Olympic team, which won a gold medal in overwhelming fashion and was inducted as a unit in 2010. The most recent Canadian to enter the Naismith Hall is Steve Nash, born in South Africa but raised from early childhood in Victoria, British Columbia, a two-time NBA MVP who was inducted in 2016.

The National Basketball Association (NBA) recognizes its first ever game as being a contest between the New York Knickerbockers and Toronto Huskies at Toronto's Maple Leaf Gardens on November 1, 1946.
The NBA expanded into Canada in 1995 with the addition of the Toronto Raptors and Vancouver Grizzlies. The Grizzlies moved to Memphis, Tennessee in 2001, but the Raptors continue to draw healthy crowds at Scotiabank Arena. The Raptors won their first NBA title in 2019.

This was also a record for the number of players from any single non-U.S. country at the start of any NBA season.

Canadian football

In Canada, the term "football" is used to refer to Canadian football, a gridiron-based game closely related to but distinct from American football as played in the United States. Canadian football has its origins in Rugby football beginning in the early 1860s, but, over time, a unique code known as Canadian football developed. The first documented football match was a game played at University College, University of Toronto on November 9, 1861. One of the participants in the game involving University of Toronto students was (Sir) William Mulock, later Chancellor of the school. A football club was formed at the university soon afterward, although its rules of play at this stage are unclear. In 1864, at Trinity College, Toronto, F. Barlow Cumberland and Frederick A. Bethune devised rules based on rugby football.

However, modern Canadian football is widely regarded as having originated with a game of rugby played in Montreal, in 1865, when British Army officers played local civilians. The game gradually gained a following, and the Montreal Football Club was formed in 1868, the first recorded non-university football club in Canada. This "rugby-football" soon became popular at Montreal's McGill University. McGill challenged Harvard University to a game, in 1874. The game grew separately in parallel from this point onward in the U.S. and Canada.

Canadian football is also played at the high school, junior, collegiate, and semi-professional levels: the Canadian Junior Football League and Quebec Junior Football League are for players aged 18–22, many post-secondary institutions compete for the Vanier Cup. The Vanier Cup is the championship for U Sports football, the post-secondary Canadian football league. In addition, senior leagues such as the Alberta Football League have grown in popularity in recent years. Great achievements in Canadian football are recognized by the Canadian Football Hall of Fame; located at Tim Hortons Field in Hamilton, Ontario.

Both the Canadian Football League (CFL), the sport's only professional football league in Canada, and Football Canada, the governing body for amateur play, trace their roots to 1884 and the founding of the Canadian Rugby Football Union. Currently active teams such as the Toronto Argonauts and Hamilton Tiger-Cats have similar longevity. The CFL's championship game, the Grey Cup, is the country's single largest sporting event and is watched by nearly one third of Canadian television households. The nine CFL teams are the BC Lions, Calgary Stampeders, Edmonton Elks, Saskatchewan Roughriders, Winnipeg Blue Bombers, Hamilton Tiger-Cats, Toronto Argonauts, Ottawa Redblacks, and Montreal Alouettes. A tenth team, the Halifax-based Atlantic Schooners, is currently in an advanced planning stage.

Cricket 

The earliest reports of cricket in Canada date from 1785 where games seem to have taken place in Montreal. The first reference to cricket being played on an organized basis is in 1834 when a club was founded in Toronto and there are reports of matches being played in Hamilton and Guelph. Along with the United States, Canada was one of the two participants in the first international cricket match, which took place in September 1884. In 1867, Canadian prime minister John A. MacDonald and his cabinet declared cricket to be Canada’s first official sport.

Curling 

Curling competitions in Canada include the Tim Hortons Brier (national men's championship) and Scotties Tournament of Hearts (national women's championship.) Men's and women's (and mixed teams) national champions move on to annual international competitions, where Canadian teams have historically dominated (even over the country of curling's origin, Scotland).  The Continental Cup features a Canada vs. The World format.
Professional curling competitions include the Grand Slam of Curling, part of the World Curling Tour.
Curling Canada is the sport's national governing body; achievements are recognized by the Canadian Curling Hall of Fame.

Disc sports
In Canada, organized disc sports began in the early 1970s, with promotional efforts from Irwin Toy (Frisbee distributor in Canada), the Canadian Open Frisbee Championships, Toronto (1972–85) and professionals using Frisbee show tours to perform at universities, fairs and sporting events. Disc sports such as freestyle, disc dog (with a human handler throwing discs for a dog to catch), double disc court, guts, ultimate and disc golf became this sport's first events. Two sports, the team sport of disc ultimate and disc golf are very popular worldwide and are now being played semi-professionally. The World Flying Disc Federation, Professional Disc Golf Association, and the Freestyle Players Association are the rules and sanctioning organizations for flying disc sports worldwide. Ultimate Canada is the rules and sanctioning organization for disc ultimate in Canada.

In 2013, as a founding partner, the Toronto Ultimate Club presented Canada's first semi-professional Ultimate team, the Toronto Rush, to the American Ultimate Disc League (AUDL). They went undefeated 18–0 and won the AUDL Championships.
In 2014, the Montreal Royal and the Vancouver Riptide joined the AUDL. From 2015–2022, the Ottawa Outlaws competed in the AUDL, becoming the fourth Canadian franchise of 26 teams in total.

In 2015, the International Olympic Committee (IOC) granted full recognition to the World Flying Disc Federation (WFDF) for flying disc sports including Ultimate.

Ringette

Ringette first appeared in Canada in 1963 after it was first conceptualized by Sam Jacks, a former Toronto YMCA director who served as a Canadian soldier during World War II. Created specifically for girls by Sam Jacks while he was living in North Bay, Ontario, the sport is now most popularly played by girls and women of all ages and has experienced its greatest success in Canada and Finland. Unlike most organized sports, all of ringette's top athletes are female, one of the sport's most distinctive features.

By the 1980s, ringette surpassed female ice hockey in national registrations. While the sport lost potential talent once women's ice hockey became an Olympic sport, the 21st century has seen the sport regain popularity.

Canada's semi-professional ringette league, the National Ringette League (NRL) formed in 2004, becoming the first winter team sports league in North America to feature elite female athletes rather than male. The NRL acts as a showcase league for the sport.

Rugby league

Rugby league first appeared in Canada in the 20th century, although by the end of the 1980s, the sport had disappeared entirely from the nation. However, the 21st century has seen the game gain popularity in Canada. Internationally, Canada is represented by the Canadian Wolverines. Domestically, the Canada Rugby League (CRL) runs several amateur and semi-professional club competitions.

Toronto Wolfpack, the first fully professional team of any code of rugby football in Canada, began play in 2017 in the predominantly British and French Rugby Football League system. The new franchise started in the 3rd tier League 1, which offers a Promotion and relegation route to the Super League and won promotion to the 2nd tier Championship in its inaugural season. The Wolfpack spent two seasons in the Championship before earning promotion to Super League for the 2020 season. The team also competes in the Challenge Cup. Their home ground is Lamport Stadium in Toronto.

Rugby union

Canada has around 13,000 seniors and twice as many junior players spread across the country. Many of these come from Canada's rugby stronghold of British Columbia while also being strong in Newfoundland and Ontario. The Canadian Rugby Championship is the premier domestic rugby union competition since 2009, featuring four regionally based Canadian teams. In 2009, the top two teams advanced to the Americas Rugby Championship, where they faced the A national teams from Argentina and the United States. From 2010 to 2015, the country was represented at the ARC by one team, Canada A. Starting in 2016, the competition was revamped along the lines of Europe's Six Nations Championship and the Southern Hemisphere's Rugby Championship. Since that time, Canada's senior national team has competed in the ARC alongside senior national sides from Brazil, Chile, Uruguay, and the USA, plus Argentina's A national team.

The sport's domestic governing body, Rugby Canada, scrapped its previous national competition, the Rugby Canada Super League, in favour of a new national under-20 league, the Rugby Canada National Junior Championship.

The Canadian national side have competed in every Rugby World Cup to date, yet have only won one match each tournament with the exception of the 1991 tournament where they reached the quarterfinals; the 2007 tournament when their best result was a draw against Japan in the group stage; and the 2019 tournament, when they went winless in their first three group matches and then saw their final match against Namibia cancelled and scored as a draw due to an impending typhoon.

Highlights include famous victories over Scotland and Wales, and until recently frequent wins over their North American neighbours, the United States. However, since 2013, the USA has dominated the rivalry, with 11 wins and one draw from the teams' last 12 matches. Known for their trademark "hard nosed" style of play, many Canadian players play their trade professionally in English and French leagues.

The Toronto Arrows professional rugby union club debuted September 2017, and started play in Major League Rugby as of 2019. The Arrows team, an independent off-shoot of the Ontario Blues Rugby Football Club, features mostly Canadian players and staff. The team's home field is York Lions Stadium on the Keele Campus of York University.

Soccer

Soccer has been played in Canada since 1876. The Dominion of Canada Football Association was inaugurated on May 24, 1912, and initially became a member of the Fédération Internationale de Football Association on December 31, 1912. Today, Canada's governing body for soccer (both professional and amateur) is known as the Canadian Soccer Association.

Soccer is the highest participation sport in Canada, with 847,616 registered players (according to the Canada Soccer 2012 Yearbook). Male/female participation is split roughly 59/41 percent. There are 1,456 clubs in 139 districts across 12 regions (provincial and territory member associations).

Canada's annual amateur competition is known as the National Championships. Senior men's teams play for The Challenge Trophy while senior women's teams play for The Jubilee Trophy. The men's national competition was first played in 1913, with the trophy (Connaught Cup) donated by Canadian Governor-General, the Duke of Connaught. The women's national competition was first played in 1982. The Canadian Soccer Association's annual National Championships also feature competitions at the U-18, U-16 and U-14 levels. At all levels, clubs qualify for the National Championships through their respective provincial championships.

At the St. Louis 1904 Olympics, Canada won the gold medal in soccer. The Canadian team was represented by Galt FC of Ontario. From 1967 to 1988, Canada's best men's amateur soccer players also participated in Olympic Qualifying tournaments (although in the 1980s a number of those players were indeed professional). Canada qualified as host of the Montréal 1976 Olympics and then again for the Los Angeles 1984 Olympics (where it finished fifth overall). Since the early 1990s, the Men's olympic qualifying tournaments have featured U-23 players (with a mix of professional and amateur/university players).

Professional soccer

Canada's annual professional competition is the Canadian Championship, which is contested between Toronto FC, Vancouver Whitecaps FC, CF Montréal, all nine Canadian Premier League teams, and the champions of League1 British Columbia, League1 Ontario, and the Première Ligue de soccer du Québec. The national champion qualifies for the CONCACAF Champions League from which a confederation champion then qualifies for the annual FIFA Club World Cup. Toronto FC is the only Canadian club to have won the MLS Cup, having done so on December 9, 2017.

A minority of the teams in the Canadian Championship play in U.S.-based leagues. Toronto FC, Vancouver Whitecaps FC and CF Montréal play in Major League Soccer. FC Edmonton played in the second-level North American Soccer League until going dormant in late 2017, and Ottawa Fury FC voluntarily dropped from the NASL to the third-level United Soccer League, now known as the USL Championship (USLC), after the 2016 season. FC Edmonton ultimately resumed professional operations in 2019 as inaugural Canadian Premier League members, while Fury FC continued in the USLC until folding after the 2019 season.

Two other Canadian professional sides play in U.S.-based leagues. Toronto FC's reserve side, Toronto FC II, which is ineligible for the Canadian Championship due to its relation to the MLS side, started play in the league now known as the USLC in 2014, and remained at that level through the 2018 season. In 2019, TFC II moved to the new third-level USL League One, continuing to play in that league through the 2021 season before moving to the newly established MLS Next Pro, a different third-level league made up almost entirely of MLS reserve sides, in 2022. Whitecaps FC revived its former reserve side of Whitecaps FC 2 in 2022 after a five-year hiatus, with Whitecaps 2 also playing in Next Pro. Whitecaps 2, also ineligible for the Canadian Championship due to its relationship with the MLS side, will adopt a new name after the 2022 season.

The Canadian Premier League (CPL) is a professional soccer league that began play in spring 2019, consisting of an initial seven teams; one is based in the outer suburbs of Toronto, with all others in Canadian markets not served by Major League Soccer. An eighth team, Atlético Ottawa, began CPL play in 2020, while Vancouver FC is scheduled to debut in 2023 as the league's ninth team. Two more teams have been announced for Saskatoon and Windsor, but no entry dates have been announced. The league has a minimum requirement of Canadian players on each roster and an annual draft of U Sports players, to develop Canadian talent. The eventual goal of the league is to have multiple divisions with promotion and relegation.

Canada's best soccer players—male and female—play in professional leagues around the world. Players are called into the national program at different times of the year, primarily in conjunction with the FIFA International Calendar (when professional clubs are required to release players for national duty).

Canada's national teams compete in CONCACAF, the Confederation of North, Central American and Caribbean Association Football. Canada's national "A" team has won two CONCACAF championships: in 1985 to qualify for the 1986 FIFA World Cup and in 2000 to qualify for the FIFA Confederations Cup.  In 2022, the men's side finished first in the final CONCACAF qualifying group for the 2022 FIFA World Cup. They have also qualified for the 2026 FIFA World Cup as hosts.

Canada's women's "A" team has also won two CONCACAF championships: in 1998 and 2010. The Canadian women have participated in six FIFA Women's World Cups (Sweden 1995, United States 1999, United States 2003, China 2007, Germany 2011 and as hosts in 2015) and four Women's Olympic Football Tournaments (Beijing 2008, London 2012, Rio 2016, and Tokyo 2020/21), winning bronze medals in both London and Rio and gold in Tokyo. Canada also hosted the FIFA Women's World Cup in 2015. The country has also hosted four age-grade World Cups—the FIFA U-17 World Cup in 1987 (when the age limit was 16 instead of the current 17), the inaugural FIFA U-20 Women's World Cup in 2002 (when the age limit was 19 instead of 20), the FIFA U-20 World Cup in 2007, and the U-20 Women's World Cup for a second time in 2014. Canada will host the 2026 FIFA World Cup jointly with Mexico and the United States.

Other team sports

Australian rules football in Canada is a minor participation sport and is governed by AFL Canada. The sport has been played in the country since 1989 when the first league was formed. The sport is quickly becoming popular, with the Ontario Australian Football League being the biggest outside of Australia. The men's Canada national Australian rules football team and a women's national team both who regularly play international matches and play in the Australian Football International Cup which is essentially a World Cup for all countries apart from Australia which is the only place where the sport is played professionally. Mike Pyke became the first Canadian to play in the Australian Football League when he was drafted by the Sydney Swans in 2008, and became the first Canadian to play in an AFL premiership (championship-winning) team when the Swans won the 2012 AFL Grand Final.

Cricket in Canada never caught on the way it did in the rest of the British Empire. While Canada is not sanctioned to play Test matches, the national team does take part in One Day International (ODI) matches and also in first-class games (in the ICC Intercontinental Cup) against other non-Test-playing opposition, with a rivalry against the United States. The match between these two nations is in fact the oldest international fixture in cricket, having first been played in 1844. 
Canada has participated in the 1979, 2003 and 2007 Cricket World Cups, and qualified for the 2011 Cricket World Cup.
In February 2018, the ICC sanctioned the Global T20 Canada, the first franchise-based Twenty20 league in North America.

Canada featured a men's national team in beach volleyball that competed at the 2018–2020 NORCECA Beach Volleyball Continental Cup.

Individual sports

Bowling

The sport of bowling takes several forms in Canada, including ten-pin and lawn bowling, but most notably Canada has its own version: Five-pin bowling, which was invented circa 1909 by Thomas F. Ryan in Toronto, Ontario, at his Toronto Bowling Club, in response to customers who complained that the ten-pin game was too strenuous. He cut five tenpins down to about 75% of their size, and used hand-sized hard rubber balls, thus inventing the original version of five-pin bowling. Five-pin is played in all parts of Canada, but not played in any other country.  Candlepin bowling, regulated by the International Candlepin Bowling Association in both Canada and the United States, is played at several centres in Nova Scotia and New Brunswick.

In Quebec, a variation of duckpin bowling is played using pins with rubber bands around their widest section, known in French as petites quilles.

Combat sports

Boxing

Canada has produced several boxing world champions, including heavyweights Tommy Burns and Lennox Lewis. Boxing is generally learned in independent gyms, located in most large Canadian cities. Canadian boxers compete in the Olympic Games and often then turn professional.

Judo

The Japanese martial art Judo has been practised in Canada for nearly a century. The first Judo dojo in Canada, Tai Iku Dojo, was established in Vancouver in 1924 by Shigetaka "Steve" Sasaki. Today, an estimated 30,000 Canadians participate in Judo programs in approximately 400 clubs across Canada.

Canadians have won five Olympic medals in Judo since it was added to the Summer games in 1964. Doug Rogers won silver in the +80 kg category in 1964, Mark Berger won bronze in the +95 kg category in 1984, Nicolas Gill won bronze in the 86 kg category in 1992 and silver in the 100 kg category in 2000, and Antoine Valois-Fortier won bronze in the −81 kg category in 2012. The Canadian Judo team trains at the National Training Centre in Montreal under Gill's direction.

Mixed martial arts
MMA has produced several notable fighters in the UFC and other promotions. Canada is the home of former UFC Welterweight and Middleweight Champion Georges St-Pierre as well as former Bellator MMA Welterweight Champion Rory McDonald.

Wrestling

Wrestling in Canada is very popular both as a recreational and as a competitive sport, and takes a variety of forms, reflecting Canada's diverse and multicultural makeup. At the middle, high school and collegiate level there is a broad-based varsity participation in Freestyle Wrestling and Greco-Roman Wrestling. Outside of schools among the general population, the dominant forms of wrestling are Judo, Submission Grappling, Brazilian Jiu-jitsu and Sambo. Each of these forms of wrestling was brought to Canada from abroad both by coaches who immigrated to Canada from elsewhere and by students of the sport who studied it overseas and returned with their enthusiasm. Examples of famous Canadian wrestlers among these various wrestling sports are such as Daniel Igali for Freestyle Wrestling, Nicolas Gill, Ron Angus and Keith Morgan for Judo, Marc Bocek for both Submission Grappling and Brazilian Jiu-jitsu. Canada has a strong showing on the international scene, at world championships and at the Olympics in all these wrestling sports.

Cycling

Cycling has increased its participation in the past few years. Several new genres of the sport have become popular in Canada, including slopestyle competition, four cross, downhill mountain biking, dirt jumping, and freeride. With the sport increasing bikes have also increased in quality and durability.

Golf
Golf is a widely enjoyed recreational sport in Canada, and the country boasts several highly rated courses. Golf Canada is the governing organization, and has over 1,600 associated member clubs and over 300,000 individual members. Golf Canada also conducts the only PGA Tour and LPGA Tour events in Canada, and it also manages the Canadian Golf Hall of Fame. PGA Tour Canada (also known as the Canadian Tour), owned and operated by the PGA Tour since late 2012, operates an organization that runs a series of tournaments for professional players. In its first season under PGA Tour operation in 2013, it held a qualifying school in California, and followed it with nine tournaments in Canada. The 2014 season saw significant expansion. Three qualifying schools were held—one in California, another in Florida, and finally in British Columbia. The BC qualifier was followed by a series of 12 tournaments, all in Canada. The top five money-winners on the tour earn full membership in the following season of the PGA Tour's second-level Korn Ferry Tour.

Twenty-seven Canadians have won a total of 77 events on the PGA and LPGA tours, combined. Ontario's Mike Weir won the 2003 Masters Tournament, becoming the first Canadian man to win one of golf's majors. The first Canadian to win any recognized major championship was Sandra Post, winner of the 1968 LPGA Championship. From 1979 through 2000, the du Maurier Classic (now known as the Canadian Women's Open) was one of the LPGA's four majors. The most recent Canadian of either gender to win a major championship was Brooke Henderson, who won the 2016 KPMG Women's PGA Championship and the 2022 Evian Championship.

Tennis

While tennis is not a huge sport in Canada, there have been several Canadian players who have had success in the last decade. Milos Raonic is regarded as one of the most successful Canadian male players in history. His career-high No. 3 ranking, as of November 21, 2016, is the highest ever ranking for a Canadian man. He is the first Canadian male in the Open Era to reach the Australian Open semi-finals (2016), the French Open (2014) quarterfinals, and the Wimbledon final (2016). In women's singles, Eugenie Bouchard became the first Canadian-born player representing Canada to reach the final of a Grand Slam tournament in singles, finishing runner-up to Petra Kvitová at the 2014 Wimbledon Championships.  She also reached the semi-finals of the 2014 Australian Open and 2014 French Open. Later in the same year she received the WTA Most Improved Player award for the 2014 season and reached a career-high ranking of No. 5, becoming the first Canadian female tennis player to be ranked in the top 5 in singles.

Canada has also had success in tennis during the late 2010s and into the 2020s with talents such as Denis Shapovalov and Félix Auger-Aliassime. On October 20, 2019, Shapovalov beat Filip Krajinović in the Stockholm Open, winning his first ATP title. Later, during the final event of the year, the Paris Rolex Masters, Shapovalov secured a top 20-year end finish after reaching the semi-finals. He reached the final as well, but lost to Novak Djokovic 6–3 6–4. He finished the season at a career high ranking of number 15. Auger-Aliassime reached a career high ATP singles ranking of No. 6 on November 7, 2022. Auger-Aliassime and Shapovalov were centrepieces of Canada's first Davis Cup-winning team in 2022.

Another notable men's player is Daniel Nestor, who never broke into the top 50 in singles but was one of the greatest doubles players in history. During his long professional career (1991–2018), he won 91 ATP doubles titles (trailing only the Bryan brothers) and 12 Grand Slam men's doubles events, an Olympic gold medal in men's doubles in 2000 with Sébastien Lareau, and four titles at the ATP Finals. He was also the first men's player to win all Slam and Masters events, the ATP Finals, and an Olympic gold medal.

In recent women's tennis, Bianca Andreescu won the 2019 Rogers Cup in Toronto, where she defeated two current top-ten players in Kiki Bertens and Karolína Plíšková. In the final, Serena Williams experienced back spasms and was forced to retire while down 1–3 in the first set. This gave Bianca her second WTA title, and a new career-high ranking of 14. With the three top-ten wins at the tournament, she won her first seven matches against top-ten opponents. At the US Open, she reached her maiden Grand Slam final, where she defeated Serena Williams, becoming the first Canadian representing Canada to win a Grand Slam singles title.

The largest tennis tournament held in Canada is the Canadian Open, also known as Rogers Cup, and is the second-oldest tournament in all of tennis (behind only Wimbledon). The Canadian Open's men's competition is a Masters 1000 event on the ATP tour. The women's competition is a WTA 1000 event on the Women's Tennis Association (WTA) tour. The competition is played on hard courts. The events alternate from year to year between the cities of Montreal and Toronto. Since 1980 in odd-numbered years the men's tournament is held in Montreal, while the women's tournament is held in Toronto, and vice versa in even-numbered years. Before 2011, they were held during separate weeks in the July–August period; now the two competitions are held during the same week in August. The Toronto tournament is held at the Aviva Centre and the Montreal tournament is held at the IGA Stadium.

Motorsport

The Canadian Grand Prix Formula One auto race had been conducted every year since 1967, and since 1978 had been held at the Circuit Gilles Villeneuve in Montreal, apart from 1987 when a dispute arose between brewers Labatts and Molson over sponsorship, again in 2009 when the race was not on the FIA calendar for one year, and most recently in 2020 and 2021 due to the Covid-19 pandemic. The track was named for Canada's first Grand Prix driver, the late Gilles Villeneuve, whose son, Jacques, won the Formula One World championship in 1997.

Several Canadians have starred in American Championship Car Racing, most notably Jacques Villeneuve, who won the 1995 CART championship and Indianapolis 500 before moving to Formula One, and Paul Tracy, who captured the 2003 CART title and collected 31 race wins. Races were held in Mont-Tremblant and Mosport road courses and on street circuits in Toronto, Montreal, Vancouver and Edmonton. In 2008, Champ Car merged with its long-time rival, the Indy Racing League (since renamed INDYCAR), under the banner of the latter body's top series, the IndyCar Series. The Edmonton race was transferred over to the new series immediately, and the Toronto event was added for 2009.

CASCAR (the Canadian Association for Stock Car Auto Racing) was the country's governing body for amateur and professional stock car racing, and the CASCAR Super Series was the highest-level stock car racing series in the country. In 2006, NASCAR purchased CASCAR and rebranded the Super Series as the NASCAR Canadian Tire Series, now known as the NASCAR Pinty's Series; nevertheless, the series remains Canada's top-level stock car racing circuit. In 2007 the Castrol Canadian Touring Car Championship was formed.
Because Canada is NASCAR's largest market outside the United States, NASCAR brought the NAPA Auto Parts 200 Busch Series (now Xfinity Series) race to Circuit Gilles Villeneuve in 2007. The race remained on the schedule until being discontinued after the 2012 season. Beginning the next year, NASCAR brought the Truck Series to Mosport with the Chevrolet Silverado 250.

Canadians have combined to win 53 races in American Championship Car Racing (Including 1 Indianapolis 500), 17 races in Formula 1 and 7 races in NASCAR's top 3 divisions (1 in the Cup Series).

Rodeo

The Canadian Professional Rodeo Association is the governing body that sanctions professional rodeo events in Canada.  The most well-known event is at the Calgary Stampede, normally held annually in July, and the Canadian Finals Rodeo, the national championship rodeo, is held in November each year.

Shooting sports

Shooting sports are a part of Canada's cultural heritage. Many Canadians enjoy participating in the various disciplines that make up this broad sport. In the past decade shooting sports in Canada have seen a major surge of popularity as more and more Canadians are applying for firearms licences.

At the recreational level individuals and families can be found across the nation improving their marksmanship skills at various private and public shooting ranges. Hunting is also a popular activity due to Canada's vast wilderness and pioneer past.

At the competitive level, many Canadians train in Olympic events. There are also a variety of other competitive shooting sports that operate provincially, nationally and internationally through their respective organizations.

Multi-sport events

Major multi-sport events with Canadian participation, or that have taken place in Canada, are the Olympic Games, Commonwealth Games, Canada Games, World Championships in Athletics, Pan American Games, and the Universiade. Others include the North American Indigenous Games, the World Police and Fire Games, and the Gay Games.

Canada Games

The Canada Games is a high-level multi-sport event with held every two years in Canada, alternating between the Canada Winter Games and the Canada Summer Games. Athletes are strictly amateur only, and represent their province or territory. Since their inception, the Canada Games have played a prominent role in developing some of Canada's premier athletes, including Lennox Lewis, Catriona Le May Doan, Hayley Wickenheiser, Sidney Crosby, Martin Brodeur, Steve Nash, Suzanne Gaudet and David Ling. The Games were first held in 1967 in Quebec City as part of Canada's Centennial celebrations. Similar events are held on the provincial level, such as the annual BC Games.

Commonwealth Games

Canada is one of only six nations to have attended every Commonwealth Games, and hosted the first ever British Empire Games in 1930 in Hamilton, Ontario. Canada also hosted the 1954 British Empire and Commonwealth Games in Vancouver, British Columbia, the 1978 Commonwealth Games in Edmonton, Alberta, and the 1994 Commonwealth Games in Victoria, British Columbia. Canada ranks third in the all-time medal tally of Commonwealth Games.

Olympic Games

Canada has competed at every Olympic Games, except for the first games in 1896 and the boycotted games in 1980. Canada has previously hosted the games three times, at the 1976 Summer Olympics in Montreal, the 1988 Winter Olympics in Calgary, and the 2010 Winter Olympics in Vancouver.

At the summer games, the majority of Canada's medals come from the sports of athletics, aquatics (swimming, synchronized swimming and diving), rowing and canoeing/kayaking. In the post-boycott era (since 1988), Canada's medal total ranks 19th in the world, with the highest rank of 11th in 1992 and the lowest of 24th in 2000.

At the winter games, Canada is usually one of the top nations in terms of medals won. Canada is traditionally strong in the sports of ice hockey, speed skating (especially the short track variation), figure skating and most of the national men's and women's curling teams have won medals since the sport was added to the Olympic program.

Because Canada failed to win any gold medals at the 1976 Summer and 1988 Winter games, soon after Vancouver-Whistler was awarded the 2010 Winter Olympics several organizations including Sport Canada and the Canadian Olympic Committee began collaborations to launch "Own the Podium – 2010", a development program to help Canada earn the most medals at the 2010 Games. Canada did not win the most total medals at the Vancouver Olympics (they finished third, behind the United States, whose 37 total medals was the most of any country at a single Winter Olympics, and Germany, with 26), but did win the most gold medals, with 14, the most of any country at a single Winter Olympics.

The National Sport School in Calgary, founded 1994, is the first Canadian high school designed exclusively for Olympic-calibre athletes.

Pan American Games

Canada has participated in each of the Pan American Games since the second edition of the games, held in Mexico City in 1955. The fifth games took place in Winnipeg in 1967, Canada's Centennial year. Winnipeg hosted again in 1999. Toronto was selected as the host city for the 2015 games, which was held in July 2015 in venues located in Toronto and several surrounding municipalities.

Amateur sports
Canadian athletes are world-ranked in many amateur sports. These include the 'winter' sports of alpine skiing, cross-country skiing, figure skating, freestyle skiing, snowboarding, speed skating, ringette, biathlon, and curling. In ice hockey, Canada supports national teams for both men and women in the under-20 and under-18 categories. In 'summer' sports, Canadians participate in rugby, soccer, disc ultimate, track and field among most sports presented in the Summer Olympics. There are sports federations for most sports in Canada. Funding for amateur athletics is provided by governments, private companies and individual citizens through donation.

Media
Major television broadcasters of sports in Canada include CBC Television, Télévision de Radio-Canada, The Sports Network (TSN), Réseau des sports (RDS), Sportsnet, and The Score. A consortium led by CTVglobemedia outbid CBC for the broadcast rights to the 2010 Winter Olympics and 2012 Summer Olympics. Major national weekly sports broadcasts include Hockey Night in Canada and Friday Night Football. There are sports radio stations in most major Canadian cities as well as on satellite radio.

Sports rankings

(Rankings current as of February 10, 2022)

References

Further reading

Hall, M. Ann (2002), The girl and the game : a history of women's sport in Canada, Broadview Press 

 Lorenz, Stacy L. "'A Lively Interest on the Prairies': Western Canada, the Mass Media, and a 'World of Sport' 1870-1939." Journal of Sport History 27.2 (2000): 195-227. online
 Leonardo, Tony and Zagoria, Adam co-authored "Ultimate:  The First Four Decades," publ. by Ultimate History, Inc., 2005, 
 Metcalfe, Alan.  Canada Learns To Play: The Emergence of Organized Sport, 1807–1914  (1987).

 Morrow, Don, and Kevin B. Wamsley. Sport in Canada: A History (2nd ed. 2009) 392pp

 Tips, Charles; Frisbee by the Masters Celestial Arts, Millbrae, California (March 1977);

External links

 Sports Canada

 
Sports venues in Canada